Kenny & Company is a 1976 American comedy-drama film directed by Don Coscarelli. It stars A. Michael Baldwin and Reggie Bannister, who would both later star in Coscarelli’s Phantasm.

Plot summary
The film covers the four days before Halloween as Kenny and his best friend Doug (both 12 years old) and awkward 11-year-old Sherman prepare for the holiday. They spend time playing flag football and skateboarding. The three boys must deal with a local bully, and Kenny gets his first crush on a girl. Kenny's beloved but elderly dog dies. The boys debut their costumes on Halloween, set off firecrackers as pranks, attend a neighbor's haunted house, and go trick-or-treating. The night culminates as they try to play a trick on an old woman who lives in a spooky, run-down house.

Cast
 Dan McCann as Kenny
 A. Michael Baldwin as Doug
 Jeff Roth as Sherman 
 Ralph Richmond as Big Doug
 Reggie Bannister as Donovan
 Clay Foster as Mr. Brink

References

External links

1976 films
1976 comedy-drama films
American comedy-drama films
20th Century Fox films
American films about Halloween
Films directed by Don Coscarelli
Films set in California
1976 comedy films
1976 drama films
1970s English-language films
1970s American films